is a 2002 platform game developed and published by Nintendo for the GameCube. It is the second 3D game in the Super Mario series, following Super Mario 64 (1996). The game was directed by Yoshiaki Koizumi  and Kenta Usui, produced by series creators Shigeru Miyamoto and Takashi Tezuka, written by Makoto Wada, and scored by Koji Kondo and Shinobu Tanaka.

The game takes place on the tropical Isle Delfino, where Mario, Toadsworth, Princess Peach, and five Toads are taking a vacation. A villain resembling Mario, known as Shadow Mario, vandalizes the island with graffiti and leaves Mario to be wrongfully convicted for the mess. Mario is ordered to clean up Isle Delfino, using a device called the Flash Liquidizer Ultra Dousing Device (F.L.U.D.D.), while saving Princess Peach from Shadow Mario.

Super Mario Sunshine received critical acclaim, with reviewers praising the game's graphics, gameplay, story, soundtrack, and the addition of F.L.U.D.D. as a mechanic, though some criticized the game's camera and F.L.U.D.D.'s gimmicky nature as well as the decision to use full voice acting for some characters. The game sold over five million copies worldwide by 2006, making it one of the best-selling GameCube games. The game was re-released as a part of the Player's Choice brand in 2003. Nintendo EPD re-released it alongside Super Mario 64 and Super Mario Galaxy in the Super Mario 3D All-Stars collection for the Nintendo Switch in 2020.

Gameplay
Super Mario Sunshine shares many similar gameplay elements with its predecessor, Super Mario 64, while introducing various new gameplay features. Players control Mario as he tries to obtain 120 Shine Sprites in order to bring light back to Isle Delfino and prove his innocence after Bowser Jr. (disguised as Mario) steals the Shine Sprites and covers the island in toxic slime. Players start off in the hub world of Delfino Plaza and access various worlds via portals which become available as the game progresses. Similar to collecting Stars in Super Mario 64, players obtain Shine Sprites by clearing a selected mission with a specific objective. Unlike its predecessor, these missions have a more strictly linear order and most other mission Shine Sprites cannot be collected until the previous missions are completed. There are also various hidden areas and challenges across Isle Delfino where more Shine Sprites can be obtained. Throughout the game, players may also find Blue Coins hidden across the island, which can be exchanged for more Shine Sprites in the boathouse at Delfino Plaza.

In this game, Mario is joined by a robotic backpack named F.L.U.D.D. (Flash Liquidizing Ultra Dousing Device), which uses the power of water to clean away goop and help Mario reach new places. Mario starts with two default nozzles for F.L.U.D.D., Squirt and Hover, which he can quickly switch between. The Squirt nozzle lets Mario spray a stream of water which he can use to clean sludge, attack enemies, and activate certain mechanisms. The Hover nozzle lets Mario hover in the air for a short period of time, allowing him to cross large gaps while simultaneously spraying things directly below him. As the game progresses, Mario unlocks two additional nozzles for F.L.U.D.D. which can be substituted with the Hover nozzle: the Rocket nozzle, which shoots Mario high up into the air; and the Turbo nozzle, which moves Mario at high speeds, allowing him to run across water and break into certain areas. Each of F.L.U.D.D.'s nozzles use water from its reserves, which can be refilled via water sources such as rivers or fountains. There are also various secret courses where F.L.U.D.D. is taken away from Mario, forcing him to rely on his natural platforming abilities. Unlike Super Mario 64, Mario can no longer long jump; he can instead perform a spin jump by twirling the analog stick and jumping, allowing Mario to jump higher and farther. Mario can also now perform dives at any time, giving Mario the ability to slide quickly across wet surfaces and serve as another alternative to the long jump. At certain points in the game, Mario may come across an egg which hatches into a Yoshi after being brought a fruit he asks for. Yoshi can be ridden upon and can attack by spitting juice, which can clear certain obstacles that water cannot. Yoshi can also use his tongue to eat enemies or other pieces of fruit which change his color, depending on the type of fruit. Yoshi will disappear if he runs out of juice or falls into deep water. Juice can be replenished by eating more fruit.

Plot
The game takes place on Isle Delfino, a dolphin-shaped tropical island. The island is mainly inhabited by the Pianta and Noki people.

Mario sets out for Isle Delfino for a vacation with Princess Peach, her steward Toadsworth, and several other Toads. Upon their arrival at Delfino Airstrip, they discover a mass of paint-like goop. After acquiring the Flash Liquidizing Ultra Dousing Device (F.L.U.D.D.), a water cannon created by Professor E. Gadd, Mario defeats a slime-covered Piranha Plant that emerges from the goop. However, Mario is arrested on suspicion of vandalizing the island with graffiti. As a result, the source of the island's power, Shine Sprites, have disappeared and the island is covered in shadow. After being convicted, Mario is assigned community service to clean up the island and track down the real criminal.

The culprit is revealed to be a shadowy blue doppelgänger of Mario known as Shadow Mario. Using a magic paintbrush, also developed by Professor E. Gadd, Shadow Mario created the graffiti. He attempts to kidnap Princess Peach but is thwarted by Mario. After the player collects ten Shine Sprites, Shadow Mario successfully kidnaps Peach, and takes her to Pinna Island. Arriving at Pinna Park, a theme park on the island, Mario encounters and destroys Mecha Bowser, a giant Bowser robot controlled by Shadow Mario. Afterwards, Shadow Mario reveals that his true identity is Bowser Jr., and that he framed Mario because his father, Bowser, told him that Peach is his mother whom Mario was trying to kidnap. Mecha Bowser's head then transforms into a hot air balloon and Bowser Jr. takes Peach to Corona Mountain.

After the player defeats Bowser Jr. (in his Shadow Mario disguise) in the seven main levels, Delfino Plaza becomes flooded, and the way to Corona Mountain is opened. Mario travels through the lava-filled caverns and finds Bowser, Bowser Jr. and Princess Peach in a giant hot tub in the sky. Mario defeats Bowser and Bowser Jr. by destroying the hot tub, causing everyone to fall from the sky. Bowser and Bowser Jr. land on a platform in the ocean, while Mario and Peach land on a small island. However, F.L.U.D.D. is damaged by the fall and powers down. Mario and Peach watch as the Shine Gate's power is restored while a group of Piantas and Nokis celebrate. Meanwhile, Bowser admits to his son that Peach is not really his mother, to which Bowser Jr. replies that he already knows, and that when he is older he wants to fight Mario again. Mario and Princess Peach watch the sunset at Sirena Beach, and the Toads present Mario with F.L.U.D.D., who has been repaired, and he declares that the vacation begins now.

Development

A sequel to Super Mario 64 had been in development for several years; the canceled games Super Mario 64 2/Super Mario 128 were some ideas Nintendo had for a direct sequel. Super Mario Sunshine began development in Late 2000/Early 2001. Super Mario Sunshine was first shown at Nintendo Space World 2001. The game was later shown again at E3 2002. It was developed by Nintendo EAD.

The game received the first lead directing role for Nintendo designer Yoshiaki Koizumi following a ten-year-long apprenticeship working on various other games. Super Mario creators Shigeru Miyamoto and Takashi Tezuka served as producers. It was the first Nintendo first-party game after Satoru Iwata became president of Nintendo, succeeding Hiroshi Yamauchi. Developing a Mario game for the GameCube was the last request Yamauchi gave the team before resigning. In an interview about the development of Super Mario Sunshine with Koizumi, Kenta Usui, and Tezuka, it was mentioned that the game's development began after showing Super Mario 128 and following the critical and commercial success of The Legend of Zelda: Majora’s Mask, when Koizumi conceived the idea of gameplay involving a water pump. However, at first Koizumi, Miyamoto and Tezuka thought that the world was too daringly out of character with Mario. There were ten candidates for possible water nozzles, and F.L.U.D.D. was chosen because of fitting in the game's setting, though it was not one of the favorites. They also stated that several Yoshi features were omitted, such as Yoshi vomiting water fed to him. It was the first in the Mario series to include Peach’s panneria-like overskirt and ponytail and Toad’s different colored spots, and vests with yellow outlines.

Koji Kondo and Shinobu Tanaka composed the score to Super Mario Sunshine. Kondo composed the main motif for Isle Delfino, Bianco Hills, Ricco Harbor, and Gelato Beach, as well as the ending credits, while additional music was composed by Tanaka. The soundtrack features various arrangements of classic Mario tunes, including the underground music and the main stage music from the original Super Mario Bros.

Super Mario Sunshine features many of the usual voice actors for the various Mario characters. Charles Martinet voices Mario, Jen Taylor voices Princess Peach and Toad, Kit Harris voices F.L.U.D.D. and the Nokis, Scott Burns voices Bowser in the character's first speaking role in a video game, Toadsworth, and the male Piantas, and Dolores Rogers voices Bowser Jr. and the female Piantas. Unlike most games of the series, the cutscenes in Super Mario Sunshine feature  full English voice acting.

Release
Super Mario Sunshine was released in Japan on July 19, 2002. It was later released in the United States on August 26 of that year. A GameCube bundle containing the game along with a GameCube console was released in North America on October 14, 2002. The game was re-released alongside Super Mario 64 (1996) and Super Mario Galaxy (2007) in the Super Mario 3D All-Stars collection on Nintendo Switch on September 18, 2020.

Reception

Super Mario Sunshine was critically acclaimed by game critics. IGN praised the addition of the water backpack for improving gameplay, and GameSpy commented on the "wide variety of moves and the beautifully constructed environments". The game received a perfect score from Nintendo Power, who commended the "superb graphics, excellent music, clever layouts, funny cinema scenes and ingenious puzzles".

Super Mario Sunshine won GameSpots annual "Best Platformer on GameCube" award. GamePro gave it a perfect score, stating that the game was "a masterpiece of superior game design, infinite gameplay variety, creativity, and life." The American-based publication Game Informer said that the game is arguably "the best Mario game to date." Computer and Video Games also mentioned the game is "better than Super Mario 64." The game placed 46th in Official Nintendo Magazine'''s 100 greatest Nintendo games of all time. Allgame gave a lower review, stating that "During the six-year span between Super Mario 64 and Super Mario Sunshine, platform games have become more epic, more interactive, and prettier. Yet the core element of collecting items in a world divided into sub-sections has been left unchanged. So it comes with a modicum of disappointment that Super Mario Sunshine doesn't shake up the genre with a number of new and fresh ideas other than the usual enhancements expected from a sequel."

Some reviewers were critical towards certain aspects of the game. GameSpot's Jeff Gerstmann criticized the various additions, including F.L.U.D.D. and Yoshi, calling them "mere gimmicks." He also complained about the camera system.  Gerstmann said that the game seemed somewhat unpolished and rushed, a sentiment shared by Matt Wales of Computer and Video Games. GameSpot named it 2002's most disappointing GameCube game.

Sales
In Japan, more than 400,000 copies of Super Mario Sunshine were sold within four days. In the United States, more than 350,000 copies were sold within its first ten days of release, surpassing launch sales of the PlayStation 2's Grand Theft Auto III, the Xbox's Halo, and the Nintendo 64's Super Mario 64, and boosting hardware sales of the GameCube. In Europe, 175,000 units were sold within a week of its release. In Japan, 624,240 units had been sold by October 2002. In 2002, Super Mario Sunshine was the tenth best-selling game in the United States according to the NPD Group. It was re-released in 2003 as part of the Player's Choice line, a selection of games with high sales sold for a reduced price. By July 2006, 2.5 million copies were sold for $85 million, in the United States alone. Next Generation ranked it as the ninth highest-selling game launched for the PlayStation 2, Xbox, or GameCube between January 2000 and July 2006 in that country. By June 2006, over 5.5 million copies had been sold worldwide. Despite strong sales numbers, Satoru Iwata confirmed at E3 2003 that the game's sales (Along with those of Metroid Prime) had failed to live up to the company's expectations.

LegacySuper Mario Sunshine introduced several elements that were carried over into subsequent Mario games. Many of the bosses from this game and Luigi's Mansion appear in multiple Mario spin-offs that followed on the GameCube, such as the unlockable Petey Piranha and King Boo in Mario Kart: Double Dash and the four unlockable characters in Mario Golf: Toadstool Tour. The central goop hazard featured in Super Mario Sunshine also reappears in later Mario titles, mostly through attacks by Bowser Jr. and Petey Piranha.Super Mario Sunshine introduces the Shine Sprites, which have appeared in later Mario games such as Mario Kart DS and Paper Mario: The Thousand-Year Door. It is also the debut of Bowser Jr., who has since become a recurring character in games such as New Super Mario Bros., Mario Kart Wii, New Super Mario Bros. Wii, New Super Mario Bros. U, Super Mario Galaxy, and Super Mario Galaxy 2, and in later Mario spin-off and sports games. It introduces recurring character Petey Piranha. Piantas appear in Super Mario Galaxy 2 in the Starshine Beach Galaxy and in Paper Mario: The Thousand Year Door in Rogueport.

The game is the first 3D Super Mario game with the ability to ride Yoshi. The Super Smash Bros. series has numerous references to original elements of Super Mario Sunshine; most notably, F.L.U.D.D. has been featured as a part of Mario's moveset since Super Smash Bros. Brawl.

In the action-adventure games Asterix & Obelix XXL 2: Mission: Las Vegum and Asterix & Obelix XXL 2: Mission: Wifix'', one of the Roman foes you will face has a similar appearance to Mario with F.L.U.D.D. attached to his back.

Notes

References

2002 video games
3D platform games
GameCube games
Graffiti video games
Nintendo Entertainment Analysis and Development games
Open-world video games
Single-player video games
Sunshine
Works about vacationing
Wrongful convictions in fiction
Video games developed in Japan
Video games produced by Shigeru Miyamoto
Video games produced by Takashi Tezuka
Video games scored by Koji Kondo
Video games set in amusement parks
Video games set on fictional islands
GameCube-only games